Kyle Wilson may refer to:

 Kyle Wilson (cornerback) (born 1987), American football cornerback
 Kyle Wilson (cricketer) (born 1989), South African cricketer
 Kyle Wilson (English footballer) (born 1985), English footballer
 Kyle Wilson (ice hockey) (born 1984), Canadian ice hockey forward
 Kyle Wilson (linebacker) (born 1995), American football linebacker